Manuel Corona may refer to:

 Manuel Corona (musician) (1880–1950), Cuban musician
 Manuel Corona (footballer), German footballer